Buctzotz is a town and the municipal seat of the Buctzotz Municipality, Yucatán in Mexico. As of 2010, the town has a population of 7,515.

Demographics

References

Populated places in Yucatán